The 2019–20 Edmonton Oilers season was the 41st season for the National Hockey League (NHL) franchise that was established on June 22, 1979, and 48th season including their play in the World Hockey Association (WHA).

The season was suspended by the league officials on March 12, 2020, after several other professional and collegiate sports organizations followed suit as a result of the ongoing COVID-19 pandemic. On May 26, the NHL regular season was officially declared over with the remaining games being cancelled. The Oilers advanced to the playoffs for the first time since the 2016–17 season and lost to the Chicago Blackhawks in four games in the qualifying round.

The season also saw one of their roster players, Colby Cave die after suffering a brain bleed due to a colloid cyst after being in a coma for four days.

Regular season
The Oilers started their season with a 3–2 win against the Vancouver Canucks on October 2. The Oilers had a 5-game winning streak, where they came back in all those games, that set an NHL record.

Standings

Divisional standings

Western Conference

Tiebreaking procedures
 Fewer number of games played (only used during regular season).
 Greater number of regulation wins (denoted by RW).
 Greater number of wins in regulation and overtime (excluding shootout wins; denoted by ROW).
 Greater number of total wins (including shootouts).
 Greater number of points earned in head-to-head play; if teams played an uneven number of head-to-head games, the result of the first game on the home ice of the team with the extra home game is discarded.
 Greater goal differential (difference between goals for and goals against).
 Greater number of goals scored (denoted by GF).

Schedule and results

Pre-season
The pre-season schedule was published on June 13, 2019.

Regular season
The regular season schedule was published on June 25, 2019.

Playoffs 

The Oilers were defeated in four games by the Chicago Blackhawks in the qualifying round.

Player statistics

Skaters

Goaltenders

†Denotes player spent time with another team before joining the Oilers. Stats reflect time with the Oilers only.
‡Denotes player was traded mid-season. Stats reflect time with the Oilers only.

Transactions
The Oilers have been involved in the following transactions during the 2019–20 season.

Trades

Free agents

Waivers

Contract terminations

Retirement

Signings

Draft picks

Below are the Edmonton Oilers' selections at the 2019 NHL Entry Draft, which was held on June 21 and 22, 2019, at the Rogers Arena in Vancouver.

Notes:
 The New York Islanders' third-round pick went to the Edmonton Oilers as the result of a trade on February 24, 2018, that sent Brandon Davidson to New York in exchange for this pick.

References

External link

Edmonton Oilers seasons
Edmonton Oilers
Oilers
Oilers